The 2010 Minnesota gubernatorial election was held on Tuesday, November 2, 2010 to elect the 40th Governor of the U.S. state of Minnesota for a four-year term to begin in January 2011. The general election was contested by the major party candidates State Representative Tom Emmer (R–Delano), former U.S. Senator Mark Dayton (DFL), and Independence Party candidate Tom Horner. After a very close race, Dayton was elected governor. Emmer would be elected to the United States House of Representatives four years later.

This was the first time the Democrats won the governorship since Rudy Perpich won re-election in 1986. With a margin of 0.4%, this election was the closest race of the 2010 gubernatorial election cycle.

Republican primary
After incumbent Governor Tim Pawlenty announced in June 2009 that he would not seek a third term, the field was open for Republicans to seek their party's endorsement.  At the Minnesota GOP's off-year state convention in October 2009, former Representative Marty Seifert took first place in a straw poll with 37% of the vote. Representative Tom Emmer took second place with 23%, Patricia Anderson had 14%, and the rest of the participating candidates received less than 10% each.

Seifert had another victory in the February 2 precinct caucuses, winning a statewide straw poll of caucus attendees with 50% of the vote, followed by Emmer with 39%. None of the other candidates got beyond single digits. Delegates to the state convention, however, were more closely divided between Emmer and Seifert than the initial straw poll indicated. Both camps claimed a delegate lead throughout the process leading up to the state convention, but the outcome was uncertain and was ultimately decided on the convention floor.

On April 30, Emmer won the Republican endorsement at the party's state convention in Minneapolis. After Emmer won 56% of the vote on the second ballot, Seifert withdrew from the race and threw his support to Emmer. Emmer then chose Metropolitan Council member Annette Meeks as his running mate for lieutenant governor.

Emmer won the August 10 primary, earning a spot on the November ballot.

Candidates

Declared
Bob Carney Jr., inventor
William McGaughey
Leslie Davis, environmental activist
Gregory K. Soderberg
Tom Emmer, state representative
Annette Meeks, Metropolitan Council Member
Ole Savior, perennial candidate, artist, poet;
Todd "Elvis" Anderson, Elvis impersonator

Withdrew
Patricia Anderson, former State Auditor
Bill Haas, former state representative, former mayor of Champlin
David Hann, state senator
Phil Herwig, activist
Mike Jungbauer, state senator, former mayor of East Bethel
Paul Kohls, state representative
Marty Seifert, state representative, former State House Minority Leader

Declined
Laura Brod, state representative
Norm Coleman, former U.S. Senator, former St. Paul mayor
Paul Koering, state senator
Tim Pawlenty, incumbent governor
Jim Ramstad, former U.S. Representative
Brian Sullivan, businessman
Steve Sviggum, Commissioner of Labor and Industry and former State House Speaker
Charlie Weaver, former Commissioner of Public Safety

Results

Democratic–Farmer–Labor primary
The list of candidates seeking the DFL's nomination was long going into the February 2 caucuses, with over 11 candidates having submitted their names for the candidate preference ballot. Former U.S. Senator Mark Dayton notably declined to be included on the ballot. Minneapolis Mayor R. T. Rybak won the straw poll with 21.8% of the vote, with State House Speaker Margaret Anderson Kelliher receiving 20.1%, and "uncommitted" receiving 14.7%. The other each candidates received single-digit support.

Former State Senator Steve Kelley dropped out of the race after a disappointing result in the straw poll. State Senator Tom Bakk also dropped out on March 20 after announcing at the St. Louis County Convention that he believed his chances of winning were slim.

On April 24, the DFL State Convention was held in Duluth. State Senator John Marty withdrew from the race after seeing lower than expected support on the first ballot, and State Representative Tom Rukavina withdrew after the fourth ballot, endorsing Kelliher. State Representative Paul Thissen withdrew after the fifth ballot, and before the results of the sixth ballot were announced, Rybak withdrew as well, endorsing Kelliher. Kelliher was subsequently endorsed by the convention. Ramsey County Attorney Susan Gaertner, who had not sought the DFL endorsement but was planning to run in the primary, dropped out two days later. That left Kelliher facing Dayton and former State House Minority Leader Matt Entenza in the August primary.

Shortly after the end of the 2010 legislative term, all three major DFL candidates had announced their choices for lieutenant governor. On May 21, Kelliher announced that John Gunyou would be her running mate. Gunyou is Minnetonka City Manager and was state finance commissioner in Republican Governor Arne Carlson's administration. On May 24, Dayton announced Yvonne Prettner Solon as his running mate. Solon is a psychologist and three-term state senator. On May 27, Entenza announced Robyne Robinson as his running mate. Robinson is a small-business owner and former TV anchor.

Dayton narrowly won the August 10 primary, earning the right to serve as his party's nominee. He was formally endorsed by the DFL on August 21.

Candidates

Declared
Mark Dayton, former United States Senator
Yvonne Prettner Solon, Minnesota State Senator
Matt Entenza, former State House Minority Leader
Robyne Robinson, former television personality
Margaret Anderson Kelliher, State Speaker of the House
John Gunyou, Minnetonka City Manager
Peter Idusogie
Lady Jayne Fontaine

Withdrew
Tom Bakk, state senator
Susan Gaertner, Ramsey County Attorney
Steve Kelley, former state senator
John Marty, state senator and 1994 DFL gubernatorial nominee
Patricia Torres Ray, state senator
Tom Rukavina, state representative
R.T. Rybak, Minneapolis mayor
Paul Thissen, state representative

Declined
Chris Coleman, Mayor of Saint Paul
Mike Opat, Chairman of the Hennepin County Board of Commissioners

Polling

Results

At 11:50 p.m. on primary night, Dayton took the lead from Kelliher, who had held an ever-shrinking lead since the polls closed.

Independence primary
On Sunday, May 9, 2010, Tom Horner won the endorsement of the Independence Party for governor. His main opponent, Rob Hahn, said he would contest the primary.

Horner won the August 10 primary, defeating Hahn to earn a place on the November ballot.

Candidates
Rob Hahn
Thomas J. Harens
Tom Horner, public affairs consultant
Jim Mulder
Phil Ratté
Gayle-Lynn Lemaster
John T. Uldrich
Stephen Williams
Rahn V. Workcuff
Mark F. Workcuff

Withdrew
Joe Repya, former lieutenant colonel in the U.S. Army

Declined
Tim Penny, former U.S. Representative
Dean Barkley, former U.S. Senator
Peter Bell, Metropolitan Council Chair
David Olson, Minnesota Chamber of Commerce President

Results

General election
Early polls showed Emmer even with his likely DFL opponents, with Horner trailing far behind, and a large percentage of voters undecided. As the race progressed, polls showed the candidates even, or Dayton with a small but significant lead. The nonpartisan Cook Political Report, CQ Politics and pollster Rasmussen Reports rated the gubernatorial election a tossup, while New York Times political statistician Nate Silver gave Dayton an 86% chance of winning and Emmer 14%.

Dayton led Emmer at the close of balloting by 8770 votes (0.42%). The margin of victory was small enough to trigger an automatic recount under state law, but analysts generally thought it unlikely that Dayton's lead would be overturned.

Dayton became just the fourth victorious Minnesota Democrat to win a gubernatorial election with a Democrat in the White House in 28 cycles.

Candidates
Tom Emmer (R) – State Representative; and Annette Meeks, Metropolitan Council Member
Mark Dayton (DFL) – former United States Senator; and Yvonne Prettner Solon, Minnesota State Senator
Tom Horner (IP) – public affairs consultant; and Jim Mulder
Ken Pentel (EDP) and Erin Wallace
Farheen Hakeem (G) and Dan Dittman
Chris Wright (GR) and Edwin Engelmann
Linda Eno (Resource Party) and Howard Hanson

Predictions

Polling

 Graphical summary

With Entenza

With Kelliher

With Pawlenty

With Emmer

With Seifert

With Coleman

Results

Ballot recount

Certified Results After Recount

The recount was carried out by the Minnesota Secretary of State, Mark Ritchie, as part of a State Canvassing Board, which consists of the secretary of state, two justices of the Minnesota Supreme Court, and two judges of a Minnesota district court. The vote totals were not changed, and Dayton was declared the governor-elect.

References

External links
Complete Set of 2010 Minnesota Governor Polling Data and Interactive Graph
Minnesota Secretary of State – Elections & Voting
Minnesota State Offices at Project Vote Smart
Campaign contributions for 2010 Minnesota Governor from Follow the Money
2010 Minnesota Gubernatorial Primary Election Matchups graph of multiple polls from Pollster.com
Election 2010: Minnesota Governor from Rasmussen Reports
2010 Minnesota Governor – Emmer vs. Dayton vs. Horner from Real Clear Politics
2010 Minnesota Governor's Race from CQ Politics
2010 MN Governor's Race from Politics in Minnesota
Race Profile in The New York Times
State Elections at the Minneapolis Star-Tribune

Official campaign websites (Archived)
Mark Dayton for Governor (DFL)
Margaret Anderson Kelliher for Governor (DFL)
Tom Horner for Governor (IP)
Tom Emmer for Governor (R)
Ken Pentel for Governor (EDP)

Gubernatorial
2010
Minnesota